Sir Richard Ros (born 8 March 1429), was an English poet, the son of Sir Thomas Ros, lord of Hamlake (Helmsley) in Yorkshire and of Belvoir in Leicestershire.

In Harl. manuscript 372 the poem of "La Belle Dame sanz Mercy," first printed in William Thynne's Chaucer (1532), has the ascription "Translatid out of Frenche by Sir Richard Ros." "La Belle Dame sanz Mercy" is a long and rather dull poem from the French of Alain Chartier, and dates from about the middle of the 15th century. It is written in the Midland dialect, and is surprisingly modern in diction.

The opening lines "Half in a dreme, not fully wel awoke, The golden sleep me wrapped under his wing," have often been quoted, but the dialogue between the very long-suffering lover and the cruel lady does not maintain this high level. See W. W. Skeat, Chaucerian and Other Pieces (1897); and H. Grohler, Über Richard Ros' mittelenglische Uebersetzung ... (Breslau, 1886).

Records last mention him in 1492.

References

1429 births
Year of death missing
English male poets